United Left of Navarre (. IUN-NEB) is the Navarrese federation of the Spanish left-wing political and social movement United Left. José Miguel Nuin Moreno is the current General Coordinator. The major member of the coalition is the Communist Party of Euskadi (EPK-PCE, Basque federation of the Communist Party of Spain).

History
In the 1996 Spanish general election IUN-NEB gained 1 of the 5 Navarrese seats in the Congreso de los Diputados.

Since 2011 IUN-NEB has a permanent alliance with Batzarre, Izquierda-Ezkerra (I-E). After the 2015 Navarrese regional election I-E signed a pact with Geroa Bai, EH Bildu and Podemos to remove the Navarrese People's Union (UPN) from power and elect Uxue Barkos as the president of Navarre.

Election results
 Parliament of Navarre

a Inside Izquierda-Ezkerra, with Batzarre.
b Of them, 2 of IUN-NEB and 1 of Batzarre.
c Of them, 1 of IUN-NEB and 1 of Batzarre.

See also
United Left (Spain)
Communist Party of Euskadi

References

External links
Official page

Navarre
Political parties in Navarre